23 is the second mixtape by British rapper Central Cee, released independently on 25 February 2022. It was preceded by the release of the singles "Obsessed with You", "Retail Therapy", "Cold Shoulder" and "Khabib". On 4 March 2022, it debuted at number one on the UK Albums Chart. It features guest appearances from Rondodasosa, Baby Gang, A2anti, Morad, Beny Jr, Ashe 22, Freeze Corleone, and his little brother, credited as Lil Bro.

Critical reception

PJ Somervelle of The Line of Best Fit called the mixtape's "subject matter and approach [...] largely consistent with Wild West", summarising it as "rapid bursts of tracks, many lasting only a couple of minutes [...], it's clear that this is fast music for the TikTok/streaming generation". Alexis Petridis of The Guardian complimented Central Cee's "powerful flow" and ability to "turn a phrase", as well as "how good [he] is at the business of making records, not just writing" with "really strong musical ideas on display". Reviewing the album for the Evening Standard, David Smyth found the mixtape to have the "murky, rumbling bass of drill music" but that Central Cee's "crisp, rhythmic lyrics are less dense with slang than the standards of the genre and he's more likely to brag about a vibrant sex life than a violent past".

Track listing

Charts

Weekly charts

Year-end charts

Certifications

References

2022 mixtape albums
Central Cee albums
Self-released albums